Petlushkwohap Mountain is a mountain in the Cantilever Range, located west of the town of Lytton, British Columbia, Canada, in that province's Fraser Canyon region.  The Cantilever Range is a small subrange of the Lillooet Ranges, the southeasternmost subrange of the Pacific Ranges of the Coast Mountains.  Petlushkwohap is the second-highest summit in the Lillooet Ranges, after nearby Skihist Mountain and is one of the mountains within the Stein Valley Nlaka'pamux Heritage Park.

References

Two-thousanders of British Columbia
Lillooet Ranges
Fraser Canyon
Yale Division Yale Land District